Cracherode is a surname. Notable people with the surname include:

 Anthony Cracherode ( 1674–1752), British lawyer and politician 
 Clayton Mordaunt Cracherode (1730–1799), English book collector and benefactor of the British Museum
 Mordaunt Cracherode (died 1773 or 1768), lieutenant governor of Fort St. Philip, Minorca